The Indexed Database API (commonly referred to as IndexedDB) is a JavaScript application programming interface (API) provided by web browsers for managing a NoSQL database of JSON objects. It is a standard maintained by the World Wide Web Consortium (W3C).

As an alternative to the Web storage standard, IndexedDB can provide more storage capacity. Web storage has fixed limits per website, but IndexedDB limits are "usually quite large, if they exist at all".

Use cases for IndexedDB include caching web application data for offline availability. Some browser modules, such as devtools or extensions, may also use it for storage.

History
Support for IndexedDB was added to Firefox version 4, Google Chrome version 11, Internet Explorer version 10, Safari version 8, and Microsoft Edge version 12.

Web SQL Database was a prior API developed by Apple. But Firefox refused to add support for it and argued against it becoming a standard because it would codify the quirks of SQLite. It was thus deprecated in favor of IndexedDB.

IndexedDB 1.0 became a W3C Recommendation on January 8, 2015. IndexedDB 2.0 became a W3C Recommendation on January 30, 2018. IndexedDB 3.0 is currently a First Public Working Draft.

Performance

Because IndexedDB is running inside of the security sandbox of a browser, all operations have to go through various security layers which decreases the performance of IndexedDB. With IndexedDB 2.0  the getAll() method was added which allows to improve performance on bulk read operations.

References

External links
 IndexedDB API on MDN Web Docs
 Browser database comparison 
 Slow IndexedDB

World Wide Web Consortium standards
Database APIs
Web technology